Norman Williams (October 6, 1791 – January 12, 1868) was a Vermont attorney and politician.  He served as Vermont's Auditor of Accounts and Secretary of State.

Early life
Norman Williams was born October 6, 1791 in Woodstock, Vermont son of Jesse Willams (1761-1842) and Hannah Palmer (1769-1837) and graduated from the University of Vermont in 1810.  He then studied law, attained admission to the bar in 1814 and established a practice in Woodstock. Williams served in the War of 1812 and afterwards continued his military service as a member of the militia. Following his military service Williams resumed practicing law.

Politics
Williams served as Register of Probate for the Hartford district in 1814 and from 1820 to 1822 and 1834 to 1835. In 1819 Williams was elected Auditor of Accounts, serving until 1823. Williams was elected Secretary of State in 1823 and served until 1831. From 1836 to 1840 Williams was Secretary of the Vermont Senate. Originally a National Republican, and later a Whig, Williams was an editor of the Vermont Mercury, a newspaper that advocated Whig policies. Williams succeeded Benjamin Swan as Clerk of the Windsor County Court, and served from 1839 until his death in Woodstock.

Business career
From 1831 to 1834 Williams lived in Montreal and pursued a business career with his brother in law. In 1834 Williams returned to Woodstock and resumed practicing law.

College administrator
Williams was an incorporator of the Vermont Medical College and served for many years as dean of the faculty.  In addition, he served as a member of the University of Vermont's Board of Trustees from 1849 to 1853.

Personal life
In 1817, Williams married Mary Ann Wentworth Brown, a member of the Appleton and Wentworth families. They had seven children, Henry Brown Williams, Mary Ann Wentworth Williams, Edward H. Williams, Charles Storrow Williams, Louisa Jane Williams, Norman Williams Jr., and Susan Arnold Williams.

In 1883, Edward H. Williams led an effort to remove from the Williams homestead the main house and surrounding outbuildings, which had fallen into disuse, and erect a library.  The facility, named the Norman Williams Public Library, is still in existence and continues to serve the citizens of Woodstock.

References

1791 births
1868 deaths
American military personnel of the War of 1812
University of Vermont alumni
Vermont National Republicans
Vermont Whigs
19th-century American politicians
State Auditors of Vermont
Secretaries of State of Vermont
Vermont lawyers
People from Woodstock, Vermont